Moosomin 112P is an Indian reserve of the Moosomin First Nation in Saskatchewan. It is 29 kilometres north of Hafford.

References

Indian reserves in Saskatchewan
Division No. 16, Saskatchewan